James Haven (né Voight; born May 11, 1973) is an American actor. He is the son of actors Jon Voight and Marcheline Bertrand, and the older brother of actress Angelina Jolie.

Early life
Haven was born on May 11, 1973 in Los Angeles, California, to actors Jon Voight and Marcheline Bertrand. His younger sister is Angelina Jolie, who became an actress. Their uncles are the singer-songwriter Chip Taylor and the geologist and volcanologist Barry Voight. On his father's side, Haven is of German and Slovak descent, and he is of French-Canadian, Dutch, Polish and German ancestry on his mother's side. Although Bertrand said she had Iroquois ancestry, Voight stated that Bertrand was "not seriously Iroquois", and a Huron woman born in 1649 is her only known Native American ancestor.

After his parents' separation in 1976, Haven and his sister were raised by their mother. She moved with them to Palisades, New York, giving up acting. A decade later, when Haven was 13, the family moved back to Los Angeles, where he attended Beverly Hills High School. Following graduation, he enrolled at the USC School of Cinema-Television. While at the University of Southern California, he received a George Lucas Award for a student film he directed starring his sister.

Career
Haven began his professional acting career in 1998. He had minor roles in several films starring his sister, Angelina Jolie, namely Gia (1998), Hell's Kitchen (1998), and Original Sin (2001). He also appeared in Monster's Ball (2001), which starred his sister's then-husband, Billy Bob Thornton. He appeared in a 2004 episode of CSI: Crime Scene Investigation and a 2007 episode of The Game.

In 2005, Haven was the executive producer of the documentary Trudell, which chronicles the life and work of Santee Sioux musician and activist John Trudell. Trudell was an official selection at the Sundance Film Festival and the Tribeca Film Festival; it won the Special Jury Prize for Best Documentary at the Seattle International Film Festival. In 2011, he served as executive producer to the short comedy film That's Our Mary, which follows two actresses awaiting the final casting decision for the role of the Virgin Mary at a faith-based film studio.

Since 2006, Haven has been the executive board director of Artivist, a festival in Los Angeles that highlights films addressing human rights, animal rights, and environmental issues.

Personal life
Like his sister, Haven was estranged from their father for several years, during which he legally dropped "Voight" as his surname. In the wake of his mother's death from ovarian cancer on January 27, 2007, he reconciled with his father after a six-year estrangement. Haven became a born-again Christian in 2009.

Filmography

References

External links
 
 Artivist, an organization supported by Haven

1973 births
Living people
20th-century American male actors
21st-century American male actors
American Christians
American film producers
American male film actors
American male television actors
American male voice actors
American people of Dutch descent
American people of French-Canadian descent
American people of German descent
American people of Slovak descent
American people of Swiss-French descent
American people of Wyandot descent
Male actors from Los Angeles
Film directors from Los Angeles
Film producers from California
Writers from Los Angeles
USC School of Cinematic Arts alumni
Voight family